The Dorlay is a river that flows through the Loire department, France. It is a tributary of the Gier, which in turn is a tributary of the Rhône. The Gier valley was formerly heavily industrialized with coal and iron mines and factories.

Basin

The Dorlay rises in Mont Pilat.
Tributaries are the Artiole, Mornante and Sellon.
The Mornante and Sellon are known for the presence of white-clawed crayfish, a heritage species.
The catchment area is about 
The upper part of the basin is forested or pastureland.

Communities

A manuscript of 1200 gives the river the Latin name of Dorleum. In 1224 it is called Aqua de Dorllei. Subsequent mentions call it Rivus de Dorlay (1359), Dorleys (1527), Dourley (1718) and Dourlay (1789).
It flows through the communes of La Grand-Croix, Saint-Paul-en-Jarez, Lorette, La Terrasse-sur-Dorlay and Doizieux.
In the past, the river powered many weaving workshops in the valley.

Dam

Construction of a dam on the Dorlay by the town of Rive-de-Gier was discussed in 1884 but the project was abandoned due to cost.

It was built between 1971 and 1973.
The dam supplies potable water to the municipalities of Lorette, Chateauneuf, Chagnon, Cellieu, St-Paul-en-Jarez, La Grand-Croix and part of Rive-de-Gier.
Since the dam is used for drinking water, swimming is not allowed - but some people swim anyway. 
Some local people use the dam for canoeing, but there are no rental boats.

Coal

In 1730 a large coal seam was found along the Dorlay.
These were worked for a short period, then abandoned due to lack of pumping equipment. Mining resumed in 1776 with pumps operating, but was abandoned in 1792 due to the volume of water entering the mines from the Dorlay.
The river's path marks a geological fault in the Loire coal basin.
but did not find any significant coal deposits.

References
Citations

Sources

Rivers of France
Rivers of Auvergne-Rhône-Alpes
Rivers of Loire (department)